The 1926 World Table Tennis Championships men's singles was the first edition of the men's singles championship.
Roland Jacobi met compatriot Zoltán Mechlovits in the final of this event. The latter won 21–12, 24–22, 21–19.

Draw

Finals

References

External links

-